is a Japanese voice actor affiliated with Aoni Production. He is best known for voicing Fushi in To Your Eternity and Patrick / Ricky in Shadows House.

Biography
Kawashima was born in Aichi Prefecture on November 30, 1995. He cited Final Fantasy X as the reason he decided to become a voice actor. Kawashima starred in his first lead role as Fushi in the anime series To Your Eternity. In 2022, he received the Best New Actor Award at the 16th Seiyu Awards. Kawashima was initially affiliated with the voice acting agency Air Agency, but has since moved to Aoni Production.

Filmography

Television animation
2021
 Shadows House as Patrick / Ricky
 To Your Eternity as Fushi

2022
 Shadows House 2nd Season as Patrick / Ricky
 To Your Eternity 2nd Season as Fushi
 VazzRock the Animation as Eita Nomura

2023
 Sugar Apple Fairy Tale as Jonas Anders
 Mashle as Finn Ames
 The Great Cleric as Luciel
 Hero Classroom as Blade

Original net animation
2017
 Station Memories as Master

Video games
2019
 Dankira!!! as Sora Asahi (young)
 Skygalleon of the Blue Sky as Eros, Krishna

2020
 Captain Tsubasa: Rise of New Champions as Player character
 Quiz RPG: The World of Mystic Wiz as Koenmaru

2021
 Tarot Boys: 22 Apprentice Fortune Tellers as Heil Lavushka
 Monster Strike as Cony Lu

2022
 Touken Ranbu as Shichiseiken

References

External links
 Official agency profile 
 

1995 births
Aoni Production voice actors
Japanese male video game actors
Japanese male voice actors
Living people
Male voice actors from Aichi Prefecture
Seiyu Award winners